Lesotho's geographic location makes it extremely vulnerable to political and economic developments in South Africa. Its capital is the small city of Maseru. It is a member of many regional economic organizations including the Southern African Development Community (SADC) and the Southern African Customs Union (SACU). Lesotho also is active in the United Nations, the Organisation of African Unity, now the African Union, the Non-Aligned Movement, and many other international organizations. In addition to the Republic of Korea, the United States, South Africa, Ireland, People's Republic of China, Libya, and the European Union all currently retain resident diplomatic missions in Lesotho. Foreign relations of Lesotho are administered by the Ministry of Foreign Affairs and International Relations.

Lesotho has historically maintained generally close ties with the Republic of Ireland (Lesotho's largest bilateral aid donor), the United States, the United Kingdom, Germany, and other Western states. Although Lesotho decided in 1990 to break relations with the People's Republic of China (P.R.C.) and re-establish relations with the Republic of China (commonly known by its main island as Taiwan), it had restored ties with the P.R.C. in 1994.

Bilateral relations

Africa

Elsewhere

Notable people
 

Lefa Mokotjo (1999–2005), ambassador of the Kingdom of Lesotho to the People's Republic of China

See also
List of diplomatic missions in Lesotho

References

External links
Further Reading from Irish Department of Foreign Affairs

 
Lesotho and the Commonwealth of Nations